Acmaeodera marginenotata is a species of metallic wood-boring beetle in the family Buprestidae. It is found in the Caribbean Sea and North America.

References

Further reading

 
 
 

marginenotata
Articles created by Qbugbot
Beetles described in 1867